Pavlov (or its variant Pavliv) may refer to:

People
Pavlov (surname) (fem. Pavlova), a common Bulgarian and Russian last name
Ivan Pavlov, Russian physiologist famous for his experiments in classical conditioning

Places

Czech Republic
Pavlov (Břeclav District)
Pavlov (Havlíčkův Brod District)
Pavlov (Jihlava District)
Pavlov (Kladno District)
Pavlov (Pelhřimov District)
Pavlov (Šumperk District)
Pavlov (Žďár nad Sázavou District)

Russia
Pavlov, Russia (or Pavlova), several rural localities in Russia

Ukraine
Pavliv, Ternopil Oblast (Pavlov), a village in Ternopil Raion of Ternopil Oblast
Pavliv, Radekhiv Raion (Pavlov), a village in Radekhiv Raion of Lviv Oblast

Other uses
Pavlov (crater), a large lunar crater on the far side of the Moon

See also
Pavel, masculine given name
Pavlof (disambiguation)
Pavlova (disambiguation)
Pavlovs, a surname
Pavlovsk (disambiguation)
Pavlovsky (disambiguation)
Pavlovo, several inhabited localities in Russia
Pavlov's Dog (band), a 1970s American rock band
Pavlov's House, a key Soviet fortress during the Battle of Stalingrad in World War II